The Black Horse is a Grade II listed public house at 166 Friargate, Preston, Lancashire, England PR1 2EJ.

It is on the Campaign for Real Ale's National Inventory of Historic Pub Interiors.

It was built in 1898, and the architect was J. A. Seward, for the Atlas Brewery Company of Manchester.

The Black Horse is currently owned by Robinsons Brewery.

References

Grade II listed pubs in Lancashire
National Inventory Pubs
Buildings and structures in Preston